Soccer is not traditionally a major mainstream sport in Canada, but the sport is growing especially in places like Nova Scotia. Up to 85,000 girls participate in soccer, which is 41% of all youth in the country.  The 2015 FIFA Women's World Cup was hosted in Canada.

History

Women's soccer was first introduced in Canada in 1922.

Soccer in Canada has often had to compete with ice hockey as a mainstream sport. In 1986, the Canadian Soccer Association designed a women's soccer program in preparation for the 1988 FIFA Women's Invitation Tournament in China. Which acted as a qualifier for the 1991 FIFA Women's World Cup which Canada failed to qualify for. Canada won the 1998 CONCACAF Women's Championship tournament. In the 1999 FIFA Women's World Cup, Canada played Japan in front off 23,000 people. In 2002 Canada lost in final of the Gold Cup to the U.S.

Canada reached the semi-finals of the 2003 FIFA Women's World Cup and reached fourth place.

In 2006, Canada again reached the final of the Gold Cup losing to the United States.

Senior team

The senior women's national soccer team's best achievement is gaining a gold medal at the 2020 Olympics, defeating Sweden. The national team enjoys greater mainstream support than their male counterparts.

Club soccer

, there are no professional or national women's soccer leagues in Canada. There are three regional pro-am leagues: League1 Ontario, Première ligue de soccer du Québec and League1 British Columbia.

From 2013 to 2021, some Canadian national team players had their salaries partially paid by the CSA and other federal government athlete funding programs to play in the National Women's Soccer League in the United States. The exact proportion of salaries paid by the CSA was negotiated with NWSL teams. Unsubsidized Canadian players could also play in the league as part of the international quota while others play in Europe. Canadian players play in the NWSL although all franchises are located in the U.S.; no Canadian franchises play in this U.S.-based league. Financial remuneration varies in the NWSL; the four-month-long league is new as of 2013 and salaries for unsubsidized players are not high enough to support them without other outside income.

See also
 Soccer in Canada

References

 
Soccer in Canada